The Battle of Hill 60 took place near Hill 60 south of Ypres on the Western Front, during the First World War. Hill 60 had been captured by the German 30th Division on 11 November 1914, during the First Battle of Ypres (19 October – 22 November 1914). Initial French preparations to raid the hill were continued by the British 28th Division, which took over the line in February 1915 and then by the 5th Division. The plan was expanded into an ambitious attempt to capture the hill, despite advice that Hill 60 could not be held unless the nearby Caterpillar ridge was also occupied. It was found that Hill 60 was the only place in the area not waterlogged and a French  mine gallery was extended.

Experienced miners from Northumberland and Wales were recruited for the digging and the British attack began on 17 April 1915. The hill was captured quickly with only seven casualties but then it was found that the salient which had been created, made occupation of the hill very costly. Both sides mistakenly accused the other of using poison gas in the April fighting; German attacks on the hill in early May included the use of gas shells and the Germans recovered the ground at the second attempt on 5 May. It remained in German hands until the Battle of Messines in 1917, when two of the Mines in the Battle of Messines were detonated beneath Hill 60 and the Caterpillar.

Background

Topography

Roads ran north-west to south-east through the area from Ypres to Verbrandenmoelen and Hollebeke and from Zillebeke to Zwartelen and Zandvoorde. Earth excavated when the railway was built had been dumped on either side, to form small hillocks. Two were on the west side, one a long irregular mound atop the ridge called the Caterpillar and a smaller mound  down the slope towards Zillebeke, known as the Dump. On the east side of the cutting, on the highest point of the ridge, was a third mound known as Hill 60, from which observers had an excellent view of the ground around Zillebeke and Ypres.

Strategic developments

The hill was a low rise on the crest of Ypres ridge, at the southern flank of the Ypres Salient and was named after the contour which marked its boundary. The hill had been captured on 11 November 225, by the German 30th Division, during fighting against a mixed force of French and British infantry and cavalry, in the First Battle of Ypres. Observation from the hill towards Ypres and Zillebeke was coveted by both sides, for the duration of the war. Hill 60 and the vicinity were held by Saxon Infantry Regiment 105 of the 30th Division, which with the 39th Division formed XV Corps of the 4th Army, at the time of the British attack.

Tactical developments

The German Imperial Army was a military force drawn from the kingdoms of Prussia, Bavaria, Saxony, Baden and Württemberg. During wartime, the federal contingents retained their identity and some independence from the Prussian Army; in matters of manpower and maintenance of the order of battle, the non-Prussian contingents kept their autonomy. The Saxon and Württemberg armies were the smallest and when the XXVIII Reserve Corps was formed, both armies contributed units, which after the XIX Corps, became the second Saxon corps in the 4th Army. The attempt to prevent the national contingents from being taken over by the Prussian army had the unfortunate result that the corps was affected by tensions between the two contingents, the Württembergers tending to denigrate the ability of Saxon units. Infantry Regiment 105, a Saxon regiment in the Prussian 30th Division relieved Infantry Regiment 132 at Hill 60 on 16 December 1914 and then took over Hill 69 and Zwarteleen by 21 December. On 29 December a French mine was sprung, which killed three soldiers and wounded twelve. During the new year, French artillery-fire increased and on 27 January the French detonated another mine near Zwarteleen; on 3 February the Saxons noticed that the troops opposite were British.

Prelude

British offensive preparations

In the first British operation of its kind, Royal Engineer tunnelling companies laid six mines by 10 April 1915, an operation planned by Major-General Edward Bulfin, commander of the 28th Division and continued by the 5th Division when the 28th Division was relieved. The locality was photographed from the air, which revealed German gun emplacements and entrenchments. On 16 April, British artillery was ranged by air observers onto the approaches to Hill 60, ready for the attack. British infantry began to assemble after dark and 1 Squadron Royal Flying Corps (RFC) was made responsible for keeping German aircraft away from the area.

Battle

17–18 April
On 17 April at  the first pair of mines were blown and the rest ten seconds later. The platoon of Saxon Infantry Regiment 105 (SIR 105) in the front line was killed and the survivors were overwhelmed, those capable of resistance being bayoneted; twenty Germans were taken prisoner for a British loss of seven casualties. An attempt to counter-attack by the 2nd Company, SIR 105 but the attack lacked liaison with the flanking companies, since the mine explosion led to the approaches being open to view by the British. Some of the survivors of the 2nd Company ran back in fear that German gas cylinders earlier placed in the front line, had been ruptured. The British began to consolidate and by  had dug two communication trenches to connect the new positions to the old front line.

German artillery-fire gradually increased on the hill, after falling around it for some time and at around  four companies from IR 99, IR 143 and a machine-gun section attacked from the front and on both flanks. The attack was repulsed by British machine-gun fire but on the right, the 8th Company of SIR 105 and pioneers managed to bomb their way close to the craters and dug in under artillery-fire. Around  on 18 April, three German counter-attacks began which were repelled with many losses; bombing parties of 2nd Company,  15 got into a crater on the German left flank but were then annihilated. German high explosive and gas shells and machine-gun fire in enfilade from Zandvoorde and the Caterpillar, forced the British back to the crest, except on the right flank, where they were forced further back. German attacks continued all day on 18 April but at  a counter-attack by two British battalions retook the hill.

19–22 April

Before dawn on 19 April, most of the 13th Brigade was relieved by the 15th Brigade. German attacks continued into 21 April, by when the hill had become a moonscape of overlapping shell-holes and mine craters. The German infantry dug a jumping-off line and a stop line further back protected by the German artillery. The divisions of II Corps and V Corps simulated attack preparations on 21 April but on 22 April, the French 45ème Division was struck by the first German gas attack of the Second Battle of Ypres and British artillery batteries were transferred northwards.

1–7 May

Hill 60 was retaken by the Germans following a series of gas attacks from 1 to 5 May. The gas arrived so quickly that most of the British troops were unable to put on their improvised respirators. As soon the gas reached the British positions, the Germans attacked from the flanks with bombing parties, as artillery laid a barrage on the British approaches to the hill. Some of the British garrison were able to return fire, which gave enough time for reinforcements to arrive, after rushing through the gas cloud. The German infantry were forestalled and bombing parties forced them back. The original garrison suffered severely for holding on despite the gas and lost many casualties.

The wind blew the gas along rather than across the British defences and only one sentry was able to sound the gas alarm. The British defence plan required troops under gas attack to move to the flanks but the course of the gas cloud made this impossible. The gas hung so thick that even after re-damping cotton respirators, it was impossible to remain in the trenches and those troops who stood their ground were overcome. German infantry of the 30th Division advanced fifteen minutes after the gas cloud and occupied nearly all of the front line on the lower slope of the hill.

The right flank of the British defence at the Zwarteleen salient was overwhelmed, which increased the gap left by the first discharge; enough men on the left survived to pin the German infantry down until  when a battalion arrived after advancing through the gas cloud and an artillery barrage. Constant counter-attacks forced some of the Germans back and regained several lost trenches. At  the 13th Brigade arrived with orders from Major-General Morland, the 5th Division commander, to retake the hill. The hill was untenable unless the Caterpillar a considerable amount of ground on the flanks was also occupied; both sides were exhausted and spent the next day digging-in. At dawn on 7 May, the British attacked the hill with two companies of infantry and attached bombers using hand grenades, all of whom were killed or captured.

Air operations

By the morning of 18 April, British troops had been pushed back to the near slope but a wireless and signal light station had been established at the headquarters of the 5th Division, to which air observers could report direct.

Next day, 1 Squadron searched for a German battery firing on trenches on the hill and located the battery which ceased fire and on 21 April, more German guns were suppressed by artillery-fire directed from the air. German attacks diminished until 1 May, when an aircraft flying towards Hill 60 caused the German artillery to cease fire as soon as it arrived, until  when failing light forced the crew to return, at which the German artillery resumed the bombardment until a German infantry attack, which was repulsed. On 5 May, the Germans attacked again and captured the crest, then held it against British counter-attacks. On 6 May, 1 Squadron conducted a photographic reconnaissance before another attack and quickly delivered them to the commander of the attacking battalion; the attack failed and operations were ended.

Aftermath

Analysis
The German army had been waiting for favourable weather to use gas in an attack at Ypres and used the fighting at Hill 60, to lay blame on the British for being the first to use gas, after the British mistakenly accused the Germans. Doubts among some of the British commanders, as to the tactical wisdom of converting a raid into an attack intended to retain the hill, were borne out by the cost of holding the hill and its loss, as soon as the Germans had the opportunity to launch a methodical counter-attack. Both sides alleged that their opponent had used gas; the Germans had dug in gas cylinders along the XV Corps front, including Hill 60 and feared that some of the cylinders had fallen into British hands. The British noticed the presence of gas but attributed it to gas shells, which were not fired onto the hill by the Germans until 20 April. The German Official History , recorded that the British used new sapper detachments to prepare the attack on Hill 60 and that on 18 April, Saxon troops had recaptured the hill except for the craters, where the attack failed because new chemical shells had been ineffective. The hill was re-captured by the Germans on 5 May and skirmishing continued until 7 May.

Casualties
In the attack on 7 April, the British lost only seven casualties. Of  casualties admitted to hospital  died.

Subsequent operations

Deep mining under the German galleries beneath Hill 60 began in late August 1915 with the 175th Tunnelling Company which began a gallery  behind the British front line and passed  beneath. The 1st Australian Tunnelling Company took over in November 1916, led in part by Captain Oliver Woodward and maintained the mines over the winter. The blasts created one of the largest explosions in history, reportedly heard in London and Dublin, demolishing a large part of the hill and killing  German soldiers.

The Battle of Messines (7–14 June 1917) was conducted by the Second Army (General Herbert Plumer), on the Western Front near the village of Messines. The offensive forced the German army to move reserves to Flanders from the Arras and Aisne fronts, which relieved pressure on the French. The tactical objective of the attack at Messines was to capture the German defences on the ridge, which ran from Ploegsteert Wood (Plugstreet to the British) in the south through Messines and Wytschaete to Mt Sorrel, to deprive the 4th Army of the high ground south of Ypres. The ridge commanded the British defences and back areas further north, from which the British intended to conduct the Northern Operation to advance to Passchendaele Ridge, then capture the Belgian coast up to the Dutch frontier.

The 47th (1/2nd London) Division and 23rd Division formed the left defensive flank of the attack, advancing onto the ridge around the Ypres–Comines canal and railway, past the mines at Caterpillar and Hill 60. The British attacks established a footing on the heap at great cost, due to machine-gun fire from the spoil heap and others in Battle Wood further north. The 23rd Division had many casualties caused by flanking machine-gun fire from the spoil heap while clearing Battle Wood, which took until the evening.

Victoria Cross
 Private Edward Dwyer, 1st East Surrey.
 2nd Lieutenant Benjamin Geary, 4th East Surrey.
 Lieutenant George Roupell, 1st East Surrey.
 2nd Lieutenant Geoffrey Woolley, 9th London.
 Private Eward Warner, 1st Bedfordshire.

See also

 Hill 60 (Ypres)
 Beneath Hill 60 - Australian film based in the battle.
 Sanctuary Wood Museum Hill 62

Notes

Footnotes

References

External links

 New York Times, 21 April 1915
 Ieper: The Second Battle of Ypres April 1915 Account of events at Hill 60
 First World War.com – Feature Articles – The Capture of Hill 60 in 1915
 Beneath Hill 60, film
 Upclose: The man that went Beneath Hill 60
 Australian Official History, Appendix No. 1, The Mines at Hill 60
 Duffy, M. The Battle of Messines Ridge 1917

Conflicts in 1915
1915 in Belgium
Hill 60, Western Front
Hill 60, Western Front
Battles of World War I involving Australia
Battles of World War I involving Canada
Hill 60, Western Front
Ypres Salient
Tunnel warfare in World War I
April 1915 events
May 1915 events